The Warren Alpert Foundation Prize is awarded annually to scientist(s) whose scientific achievements have led to the prevention, cure or treatment of human diseases or disorders, and/or whose research constitutes a seminal scientific finding that holds great promise of ultimately changing our understanding of or ability to treat disease. The prize was established in 1987 by the late philanthropist and businessman Warren Alpert and the Warren Alpert Foundation.

The Warren Alpert Prize is given internationally and since its inception, 10 winners have gone on to win Nobel Prizes.

The prize is administered in concert with Harvard Medical School in Boston, Massachusetts and the Warren Alpert Foundation, located in Providence, Rhode Island. An annual symposium is held at Harvard Medical School each fall where the recipient(s) present their work. The prize currently includes $500,000, a citation and plaque.

Warren Alpert Foundation Prize Recipients

See also

 List of biomedical science awards

References

External links
 Harvard Medical School
Warren Alpert Foundation Prize

Biomedical awards
Harvard Medical School
Harvard University
American awards